Bulgur (original ), or burghul, is a cracked wheat foodstuff found in West Asian cuisine.

Characteristics

Bulgur is sometimes confused with cracked wheat, which is crushed wheat grain that, unlike bulgur, has not been parboiled. Bulgur is a common ingredient in cuisines of many countries of the West Asian cuisine and Mediterranean Basin. It has a light, nutty flavor.

Bulgur is recognized as a whole grain by the United States Department of Agriculture.

Composition and nutrition
Cooked bulgur is 78% water, 19% carbohydrates, 3% protein, and contains negligible fat (table). A 100 gram (3.5 oz) reference serving supplies 83 calories, with no micronutrients in appreciable amounts of the Daily Value (table).

Culinary uses

Bulgur does not require cooking, although it can be included in cooked dishes; soaking in water is all that is needed.

Coarse bulgur is used to make pottages, while the medium and fine grains are used for breakfast cereals, salads such as kısır, pilavs, breads, and in dessert puddings such as kheer. Bulgur porridge is similar to frumenty, a cracked wheat porridge that was a staple of medieval cuisine.

In breads, it adds a whole-grain component. It is a main ingredient in kibbeh and, soaked but not cooked, in tabbouleh salad. It is often used where rice or couscous could be used. In Indian and Pakistani cuisine, bulgur is often used as a cereal to make a porridge with milk and sugar, or a savory porridge with vegetables and spices. It can be used to accompany other dishes in the same way as pasta or rice; it may be mistaken for rice because it has a similar appearance, although the texture is different.

Armenians prepare bulgur as a pilaf in chicken stock, with or without sautéed noodles, or cooked with tomatoes, onions, herbs and red pepper. The fine grind is used for making eech, a bulgur salad similar to tabbouleh, prepared with tomato paste, fresh tomatoes, cucumbers, parsley, olive oil, and other salad ingredients to personal taste. Pomegranate molasses, which is sour and sweet, is commonly used instead of lemon juice to add tartness. A variety of mezes and main dishes are prepared.

In Cyprus, it is known as "πουρκούρι" (poorkoori) and is used to make "κούπες" (koopehs, also known as bulgur köftesi in Cypriot Turkish), a variety of kibbeh. Its crust is usually made of bulgur wheat, flour, oil, salt and egg, then filled with ground meat (beef and/or pork), onions, parsley and spices. Vegetarian "κούπες" substitutes chopped mushrooms for the ground meat.

The Saudi Arabian version of bulgur, popular in Nejd and Al-Hasa, is known as jarish.

See also
Einkorn wheat
Freekeh
Semolina
Wheatberry

References

External links

Arab cuisine
Mediterranean cuisine
Cypriot cuisine
Assyrian cuisine
Lebanese cuisine
Levantine cuisine
Jordanian cuisine
Syrian cuisine
Palestinian cuisine
Western Armenian cuisine
Wheat
Staple foods
Turkish words and phrases
Iranian cuisine
Israeli cuisine
Kurdish cuisine
Vegetarian dishes of India